Horbourside is a reclaimed area of land at the head of Otago Harbour in Dunedin, New Zealand. It is separated from the Dunedin central business district by the Main South Line. Most of the land was reclaimed in the 19th century. It is a port and industrial/warehousing area.

A plan to redevelop the area over a 30-year period was backed in 2017 by the Dunedin City Council, Port Otago, the Otago Regional Council and others. The plan was allocated $19.9 million in October 2019 from the Provincial Growth Fund for the first stage of building, but was put on hold in 2020 due to the COVID-19 pandemic.

Demographics

Harbourside had a population of 45 at the 2018 New Zealand census, a decrease of 3 people (−6.2%) since the 2013 census, and a decrease of 15 people (−25.0%) since the 2006 census. There were 24 households. There were 27 males and 18 females, giving a sex ratio of 1.5 males per female. The median age was 23.6 years (compared with 37.4 years nationally), with 3 people (6.7%) aged under 15 years, 21 (46.7%) aged 15 to 29, 18 (40.0%) aged 30 to 64, and 3 (6.7%) aged 65 or older.

Ethnicities were 86.7% European/Pākehā, 13.3% Māori, and 13.3% Asian (totals add to more than 100% since people could identify with multiple ethnicities).

The proportion of people born overseas was 26.7%, compared with 27.1% nationally.

Although some people objected to giving their religion, 33.3% had no religion, 33.3% were Christian, 6.7% were Muslim and 6.7% had other religions.

Of those at least 15 years old, 12 (28.6%) people had a bachelor or higher degree, and 3 (7.1%) people had no formal qualifications. The median income was $15,500, compared with $31,800 nationally. 3 people (7.1%) earned over $70,000 compared to 17.2% nationally. The employment status of those at least 15 was that 15 (35.7%) people were employed full-time, 6 (14.3%) were part-time, and 6 (14.3%) were unemployed.

See also
Pelichet Bay
Southern Endowment

References

Harbourside
Ports and harbours of New Zealand